Kyle C. Strickler (born August 3, 1983), nicknamed The High Side Tickler, is an American professional racing driver who competes in dirt late models and modified cars. He previously competed part-time in the NASCAR Camping World Truck Series, driving the No. 20 Chevrolet Silverado for Young's Motorsports.

Racing career

Dirt track racing

Dirt modifieds
Strickler has been racing in the DIRTcar UMP modified dirt car series since 2014. He won the first two runnings of the modified portion of the Dirt Short Track Classic at Charlotte Motor Speedway, and won the event for a third time in 2020. Strickler usually drives a No. 8 modified car, usually for his own self-owned team.

Dirt late models
In 2019, Strickler began racing late models for Wells Motorsports. In early September 2020, he raced against an invitation-only field of top late model drivers at Eldora Speedway for $50,000-to-win. He led 65 of 67 laps but cut a tire while leading on the final lap. Later that month, he scored his first major late model victory in the Lucas Oil Late Model Dirt Series race at I-80 Speedway.

For the 2021 racing season, Strickler signed to run full-time on the Lucas Oil Late Model Dirt Series for PCC Motorsports. In January 2021, he scored his first victory on the World of Outlaws Late Model Series, winning the Sunshine Nationals finale at Volusia Speedway Park.

NASCAR
Strickler began his NASCAR career at the 2018 Eldora Dirt Derby; he drove for MB Motorsports, starting 23rd and finishing 31st due to a crash. The following year, he returned to the Truck Series' Eldora race with DGR-Crosley, finishing 18th. Strickler returned to the Truck Series in 2021 to drive in the new race at the Knoxville dirt track (which replaced Eldora on the schedule) as a last-minute replacement for Spencer Boyd in the No. 20 for Young's Motorsports.

Personal life
Strickler was born in Sinking Spring, Pennsylvania and moved to North Carolina in 2006 to further his racing career, where he met his wife and fathered two children. When not racing, he worked for former NASCAR teams Rusty Wallace Racing and Robby Gordon Motorsports.

Motorsports career results

NASCAR
(key) (Bold – Pole position awarded by qualifying time. Italics – Pole position earned by points standings or practice time. * – Most laps led.)

Camping World Truck Series

 Season still in progress

References

External links
 

Living people
1983 births
NASCAR drivers
Racing drivers from North Carolina